The Abayudaya (Abayudaya is Luganda for "People of Judah") are a community in eastern Uganda, near the town of Mbale, who practice Judaism. They are devout in their practice, keeping kashrut and observing Shabbat. There are several different villages where the Abayudaya live. Most of these are recognized by the Reform and Conservative movements of Judaism. In June 2016, Rabbi Shlomo Riskin led a Beit Din that performed an Orthodox conversion for the Putti community of Abayudaya.

The Abayudaya's population is estimated to number between 2,000 and 3,000; like their neighbors, they are subsistence farmers. Most Abayudaya are of Bagwere origin. Some, from Namutumba, are Basoga. They speak Luganda, Lusoga, or Lugwere, and some have learned Hebrew as well.

History

The group owes its origin to Muganda military leader Semei Kakungulu. Originally, Kakungulu was converted to Christianity by British missionaries around 1880. He believed that the British would allow him to be king of the territories Bukedi and Bugisu, which he had conquered in a battle for them. However, when the British limited his territory to a significantly smaller size and refused to recognize him as king as they had promised, Kakungulu began to distance himself from them. In 1913, he became a member of the Bamalaki sect, which followed a belief system that combined elements of Judaism, Christianity, and Christian Science, most notably, a refusal to use western medicine (based on a few sentences taken from the Old Testament). This led to conflict with the British when the Bamalaki refused to vaccinate their cattle. However, upon further study of the Bible, Kakungulu came to believe that the customs and laws described in the Five Books of Moses (the Torah) were really true. When, in 1919, Kakungulu insisted on circumcision as prescribed in the Hebrew Bible, the Bamalaki refused and told him that if he practiced circumcision he would be like the Jews. Kakungulu responded, "Then, I am a Jew!" He circumcised his sons and himself and declared that his community was Jewish. According to Henry Lubega, "he fled to the foot of Mt. Elgon and settled in a place called Gangama where he started a separatist sect known as Kibina Kya Bayudaya Abesiga Katonda (the Community of Jews who trust in the Lord)." The British were infuriated by this action and they effectively severed all ties with him and his followers.

The arrival of a foreign Jew known as "Yosef", presumably of Ashkenazi background, in 1920 contributed much towards the community's acquisition of knowledge about the seasons in which Jewish Festivals such as Pesach, Shavuot, Rosh Hashanah, Yom Kippur, and Sukkot take place. A source in the Abayudaya community confirms that the first Jew to visit the community was Yosef, who stayed with and taught the community for about six months, and would appear to have first brought the Jewish calendar to the Abayudaya community.

Furthermore, the laws concerning kashrut were first introduced to the community by Yosef. The community continues to practice kashrut today. Yosef's teachings influenced Semei Kakungulu to establish a school that acted as a type of Yeshiva, with the purpose of passing on and teaching the skills and knowledge first obtained from Yosef.

After Kakungulu's death from tetanus in 1928, Samson Mugombe Israeli, one of his disciples, became the spiritual leader of the community, which isolated itself for self-protection.

In 1962, Arye Oded, an Israeli studying at Makerere University, visited the Abayudaya and met Samson Mugombe. This was the first time the Abayudaya had ever met an Israeli, and the first time the community was meeting a foreign Jew since Yosef. Oded had many long interviews with Mugombe and other leaders and explained to them how Jews in Israel practised Judaism. Oded then wrote a book ("Religion and Politics in Uganda,") and numerous articles on the community and their customs which introduced them to world Jewry.

However, in the 1970s they were persecuted by Idi Amin, who outlawed Jewish rituals and destroyed synagogues. Some of the Abayudaya community converted to either Christianity or Islam in the face of religious persecution. A core group of roughly 300 members remained, however, committed to Judaism, worshipping secretly and fearful that they would be discovered by their neighbors and reported to the authorities. This group later named itself "She'erit Yisrael" — the Remnant of Israel — meaning the surviving (Ugandan) Jews.

The community underwent a revival in the 1980s. Approximately 400 Abayudaya community members were formally converted by five rabbis of the Conservative branch of Judaism in February 2002, and conversions by Conservative rabbis continued during the following years.

Today
As of 2017, the community lives near the newly built Stern Synagogue on Nabugoye Hill outside Mbale and the nearby synagogue in the village of Namanyonyi  plus others live in Nasenyi, Nalubembe, Buseta, Nangolo and the sole Orthodox community, Putti, all in Pallisa District.  An eighth village, Namutumba, with a synagogue, is in Magada Village,  approximately 70 km south. Finally, a ninth village, Apac, is way north of Mbale. A census was conducted in 2015 by village members, which showed the total population as 1067.  The breakdown per village is as follows:

2015 Abayudaya Census:
Namutumba:	244
Namanyonyi:	200
Apac:	        177
Nabugoye:	132
Nasenyi:	         96
Putti:	          77
Nalubembe:	 65
Buseta:	         50
Nangolo:	         26
Total: 1067

Namutumba, the largest village, is a thriving Jewish community with about 244 members with an active synagogue.  The community has built an interfaith primary school - Tikkun Olam Primary School (TOPS) serving its greater community, has active young leadership in economic development and is seeking to improve the lives of all its community members.  Yoash Mayende is the Director of TOPS, a completely solar campus. Rabbi (Levi) Shadrach Mugoya is their current spiritual leader. The elder Rabbi Eri appointed Shadrach to be his successor, “a great honor and a great responsibility.” Shadrach attended Uganda Christian University and graduated with a degree in Project Planning and Entrepreneurship in 2013. He studied in the yeshiva of the chief Abayudaya Rabbi, Gershom Sizomu. Shadrach is now enthusiastically pursuing his studies with ALEPH (Alliance for Jewish Renewal) so that he can lead his people well as their rabbi. The Conservative Yeshivah in Israel has accepted him to study for 2017–2018.

Gershom Sizomu, the spiritual leader of the Abayudaya and the Rosh Yeshiva, was enrolled in the Ziegler School of Rabbinic Studies five-year graduate program at the American Jewish University (formerly the University of Judaism) in Los Angeles, California where he studied Hebrew, rabbinic literature, the Bible, Jewish philosophy, and other subjects. The program entailed studies in both the United States and Israel. Upon completion of this program, Sizomu received his ordination as a rabbi under the auspices of the Conservative Movement on May 19, 2008, and returned to Uganda to lead its Jewish community. He is the first native-born black rabbi in Sub-Saharan Africa. He is also the first chief rabbi of Uganda. In February 2016 he was elected as a Member of Parliament in Uganda representing Bungokho North outside of Mbale.

A new synagogue, Stern Synagogue, named after Ralph and Sue Stern, Jewish Americans who contributed 100,000 US Dollars, now has replaced the small Moses Synagogue on Nabugoye Hill as of 2017. Other key donors are Eyal, Yael, Leya and Aely Aronoff. Julius and Ray Charlstein Foundation. Naty and Debbie Saidoff.  The synagogue is, according to Rabbi Sizomu, the biggest in Sub Saharan Africa.

An interesting latest development is the possible recognition of the Putti Abayudaya by Israel and the Orthodox Jewish world, thanks to the efforts of Rabbi Shlomo Riskin, founding Chief Rabbi of Efrat and Chancellor of the Ohr Torah Stone institute, in coordination with PVAO Putti Village Assistance Organization. This plan received a setback in 2018 when the Israel Ministry of the Interior ruled that the Putti Abayudaya were not a recognised Jewish community and so their conversion is "not recognized for the purpose of receiving status in Israel". A new mikveh (ritual bath) has been built. The community is governed by an elected board, currently chaired by Tarphon Kamya. Putti village receives outside support from PVAO (Putti Village Assistance Organization). 
	
Besides the five synagogues (Nabugoye, Namanyonyi, Nasenyi, Namutumba and Putti), Jewish schools have been established with outside help from individuals and organizations such as Kulanu where secular as well as Jewish themed subjects are taught. What is unique is that, unlike many Christian-run schools, learning Hebrew and Judaism is merely optional for non-Jewish students. Christian, Muslim and Jewish students attend these schools. Scholarships given by outside sources have enabled some students to attend Universities as well. The following are the currently existing community institutions:

 The Hadassah Primary School located between Nabugoye and Namanyonyi
 The Semei Kakungulu High School (Nabugoye Hill)
 "Tikkun Olam Primary School" (Namutumba)
 A Guesthouse (Nabugoye Hill)
 A Yeshiva (Nabugoye Hill) The building of the Yeshiva is being funded by a grant from the United Synagogue Youth Tikun Olam program
 A new Jewish Hospital (Kampala) Galilee Community General Hospital
 A new Jewish Orthodox synagogue Located right in the center of Kampala
 The Tobin Medical Centre located in Mbale Funded by Be'chol Lashon

Community relations

Their Christian and Muslim neighbors once looked upon the Abayudaya with disdain and hatred, but relations have improved significantly and some view members of the Abayudaya with respect and admiration. It should also be noted that the community has been growing at a steady rate. Numbering only 300 individuals at the time of the fall of Idi Amin, the Abayudaya have grown to as many as 2,000 individuals since that time.

In 2002 the story of the Abayudaya was told in the book Abayudaya:The Jews of Uganda, with photographs and text by photojournalist Richard Sobol and musical recordings produced by Jeffrey Summit and published by Abbeville Press. Sobol has continued to travel and lecture with a multi media slide presentation to help bring the Ugandan Jews out of isolation.

In 2007 an independent production team, "Marion Segal Productions", made a documentary film on the Abayudaya on behalf of the South African Broadcasting Corporation (SABC-TV). Its title, "Pearls of Africa," is a reference to the fact that this region of Africa is also known as the pearl of Africa. This 52 minute documentary was directed and narrated by filmmaker, Guy Lieberman, in association with producer Marion Segal, both South African Jews. Included in this documentary are interviews with Aaron Kintu Moses, J.J. Keki, Enosh K. Mainah, and other leaders of the Abayudaya, both in the Nabugoye Hill community and in the Putti community. It also includes interviews with two wives who show their Sabbath preparations, speak about their children's education, and discuss the intimate side of Jewish marriage and the need for a mikveh. The documentary generated considerable interest amongst the South African Jewish community and inspired members to make financial and other contributions (e.g. books) to the Abayudaya. Subsequent to this documentary, The South African Jewish community also hosted two of the younger generation of Abayudaya to share their stories at local Jewish events.

In 2003, J.J. Keki, a member of the Abayudaya community, led the effort to create a cooperative for coffee-growers in the region, including not only the Jewish coffee-growers, but Christian and Muslim coffee-growers as well. The result was Mirembe Kawomera, Luganda for "Delicious Peace". In partnership with Thanksgiving Coffee Company of Fort Bragg, California, the cooperative is working in bringing new prosperity to members of all religions.

Religious life and customs
As the community increased its ties and interactions with outside Jewish communities, namely in the United States and Israel, its religious ideology and customs shifted towards mainstream, normative Judaism. Members attend Shabbat services regularly both on Friday evenings and Saturdays. Congregations remove their shoes before entering the synagogue. This custom is believed to have been practiced by Jews in biblical times and is still practiced by a few Jewish communities today. The Abayudaya maintain a Kosher diet and slaughter their own animals in accordance with its regulations.

Music
Music has been an important aspect in the lives of the Abayudaya. In recent years, the community has produced two CDs that are centered on religious themes. In fact, one of the albums, entitled "Abayudaya: Music from the Jewish people of Uganda" produced by Jeffrey Summit was nominated for a Best Traditional World Music album at the 47th Grammy Awards.

In addition to this, their community has received further recognition and respect within the Jewish community because of the work of Noam Katz, a Jewish American musician. His 2005 CD, Mirembe ("peace" in Luganda), featured the Abayudaya in the majority of its songs. In addition to studying at a seminary, Katz travels throughout North America, and gives a slideshow/concert which showcases the music of the Abayudaya.

The music of the Abayudaya is distinctly African yet Jewish at the same time. Many of the songs combine words in Luganda as well as Hebrew. Additionally, Psalms and prayers are set to a distinctly African tune and rhythm. Music is viewed as important by the community for a variety of reasons. Some elders of the community have maintained that it was music that enabled the community to persevere through the harsh conditions that it had to endure under the reign of Idi Amin.

See also
British Uganda Program

References

Sobol, Richard, and Summit, Jeffrey A.: Abayudaya:The Jews of Uganda 
 Oded, Arye: "Religion and Politics in Uganda: a Study of Islam and Judaism" 1995, East African Educational Publishers, Nairobi
 Oded, Arye: "The Abayudaya of Uganda," I.A.F.A., Jerusalem, 2003 (in Hebrew)
 Parfitt, Tudor: "Black Jews in Africa and the Americas", Harvard University Press 2013

External links
The Abayudaya: The Jews of Uganda The Jewish Museum London,  2019
Putti Village Assistance Organization Includes many projects aiding the Abayudaya and hundreds of videos and pictures.
BBC photo journal featuring the Abayudaya
Abayudaya: The Jews of Uganda Photographs by Richard Sobol from his book 
Gershom Sizomu, First Abayudaya Ugandan Ordained at Ziegler School of Rabbinic Studies American Jewish University, 2007
Mbale Orthodox Community (Abayudaya) The Abayudaya Community in Kampala. Kampala Jewish Community site 2013
The lost Jews of Uganda by Kim Harrisberg. Daily Maverick 14 April 2014   
Who are the Abayudaya Jews of Uganda? A history of the community as recalled by Rabbi Gershom Sizomu and detailed information on Be'chol Lashon health and economic development projects with the Abayudaya community (from Be’chol Lashon’s old site)
Abayudaya Articles on Be’chol Lashon’s current site 
Abayudaya Links on Kulanu's site

 
Ugandan Jews
Groups who converted to Judaism
Jewish Ugandan history